Alexei Anisimov (born April 15, 1984) is a Russian ice hockey goaltender. He is currently playing with Saryarka Karagandy of the Supreme Hockey League (VHL).

Anisimov made his Kontinental Hockey League (KHL) debut playing with Amur Khabarovsk during the 2008–09 KHL season.

References

External links

1984 births
Living people
Amur Khabarovsk players
HC Lada Togliatti players
Russian ice hockey goaltenders
Sportspeople from Tolyatti